Leucopogon nutans is a species of flowering plant in the heath family Ericaceae and is endemic to the south-west of Western Australia. It is a shrub that was first formally described in 1904 by Ernst Georg Pritzel in Botanische Jahrbücher für Systematik, Pflanzengeschichte und Pflanzengeographie from specimens collected in Darlington (now a suburb of Perth). The specific epithet (nutans) means "nodding".

Leucopogon nutans is found in the Avon Wheatbelt and Jarrah Forest bioregions of south-western Western Australia. It is listed (as Styphelia nitens) as "not threatened", by the Government of Western Australia Department of Biodiversity, Conservation and Attractions.

References

nutans
Ericales of Australia
Flora of Western Australia
Plants described in 1904
Taxa named by Ernst Pritzel